Cale Fleury (born November 19, 1998) is a Canadian professional ice hockey defenceman for the  Seattle Kraken of the National Hockey League (NHL). Fleury was selected 87th overall by the Montreal Canadiens in the 2017 NHL Entry Draft.

Playing career
Fleury was drafted in the fourth round, 87th overall by the Kootenay Ice in the 2013 WHL Bantam Draft. Fleury began playing with the Ice in 2014, and was named team captain during his third and final full season with the team. On November 11, 2017, Fleury was traded to the Regina Pats to help bolster their roster in hopes of going on a deep playoff run.

Fleury was selected 87th overall by the Montreal Canadiens in the 2017 NHL Entry Draft in Chicago. On October 4, 2018, Fleury signed a three-year entry level contract with the Canadiens. He was assigned to Montreal's AHL affiliate, the Laval Rocket, where he played his first season at the professional level.

On October 1, 2019, it was announced that Fleury would appear in the Canadiens' opening night roster. On November 16, 2019, Fleury earned his first NHL point, scoring a goal during a 3–4 overtime loss against the New Jersey Devils. He split the 2019–20 season between the Canadiens and their minor league affiliate Laval Rocket of the American Hockey League.

On July 21, 2021, Fleury was selected from the Canadiens at the 2021 NHL Expansion Draft by the Seattle Kraken, reuniting him with his brother Haydn.

Personal life
Fleury’s older brother, Haydn was his teammate on the Seattle Kraken and was selected 7th overall in the 2014 NHL Entry Draft by the Carolina Hurricanes.

Career statistics

References

External links
 

1998 births
Living people
Canadian expatriate ice hockey players in the United States
Canadian ice hockey defencemen
Charlotte Checkers (2010–) players
Ice hockey people from Saskatchewan
Kootenay Ice players
Laval Rocket players
Montreal Canadiens draft picks
Montreal Canadiens players
Regina Pats players
Seattle Kraken players